Seven Songs for Quartet and Chamber Orchestra is an album by Gary Burton. A collection of compositions by Michael Gibbs, it features Burton with guitarist Mick Goodrick, bassist Steve Swallow, drummer Ted Seibs and the NDR Symphony Orchestra.

Track listing 
All tracks composed by Michael Gibbs; except where indicated
"Nocturne Vulgaire/Arise Her Eyes" (Mike Gibbs, Steve Swallow) - 9:27
"Throb" - 5:27
"By Way of a Preface" - 4:33
"Phases" - 7:23
"The Rain Before It Falls" - 4:04
"Three" - 6:12

Personnel 
 Gary Burton – vibraharp
 Mick Goodrick – guitar
 Steve Swallow – bass
 Ted Seibs – drums
 NDR Symphony Orchestra conducted by Michael Gibbs

References 

1974 albums
Gary Burton albums
ECM Records albums
Albums produced by Manfred Eicher